Anahit or Anahid is goddess of fertility and healing, wisdom and water in Iranian and Armenian mythology.

Anahit or Anahid may also refer to:
 Anahit (1947 film), directed by Hamo Beknazarian
 Anahit (2014 film), animated, directed by Davit Sahakyants
 Anahit (name)
 Anahita or Anahit, a Persian goddess
 Anahid, a supplement of the Lebanese-Armenian daily Aztag

See also
 Anahid Literary Prize, an Armenian literary prize, awarded to Arthur Nersesian in 2005
 Anahidrano, a town and commune in Madagascar
 "Anahid's Musings Op. 147", a 2006 work for two pianos and percussion by Dianne Goolkasian Rahbee
 Anahita, disambiguation